147th Street (Sibley Boulevard) is one of two Metra Electric District stations located on its Main Branch in Harvey, Illinois.

Since May 16, 2022, the station has been closed and undergone major renovations. Crews are making improvements such as adding bicycle parking, a kiss-and-ride, and an elevator to make the station accessible. The reconstruction is expected to take 12-15 months.

The station is named after both of the names for Illinois Route 83 in Harvey; Sibley Boulevard, and 147th Street. A large parking lot exists on the east side of the tracks between 147th Street and the Little Calumet River. A smaller parking lot exists on the southwest corner of Clinton and 146th Streets on the west side of the tracks.

Bus connections
Pace

  350 Sibley 
  352 Halsted

References

External links

Metra stations in Illinois
Former Illinois Central Railroad stations
Harvey, Illinois
Railway stations in Cook County, Illinois